is a Japanese insurance company. It has its corporate headquarters in the Kamiyacho MT Building (神谷町MTビル Kamiyachō MT Biru) in Toranomon, Minato, Tokyo and its Osaka offices in Chuo-ku, Osaka.

As of April 1, 2012 it has about 23,000 agencies throughout Japan, 172 sales offices, and 109 claims offices.

History
It was founded on April 18, 1918.

In 2011 Chartis Japan Capital Co, a unit of the American International Group Inc., acquired 43.59% of the outstanding shares not already owned Fuji Fire and Marine. On March 30, 2011 Chartis was to own 98.25% of Fuji Fire and Marine, making it a wholly owned subsidiary. Fuji Fire and Marine was to be delisted from the stock exchanges as a result.

References

External links

 Fuji Fire and Marine Insurance
 Fuji Fire and Marine Insurance 

Financial services companies established in 1918
Insurance companies based in Tokyo
American International Group
Japanese companies established in 1918
Marine insurance companies